The Qarlughids were a tribe of Turkic origin that controlled Ghazni, lands of the Bamyan, the Kurram Valley (Ghazna, Banban, and Kurraman), and established a short-lived Muslim principality and dynasty that lasted between 1236 and 1266. The Qarlughids (or Karluk Turks) arrived from the north to settle in the regions of Hazarajat together with the armies of Muhammad II of Khwarezm, the Shah of Khwarezm.

Throughout most of its existence, the Qarlugh Kingdom functioned as a buffer state between its two powerful neighbors, the Delhi Sultanate to the east and south and the Mongol Empire to the north and west. With the Malik at the throne, the Qarlugh would frequently switch allegiances between their two powerful neighbors and through balanced diplomacy managed to become an important trade intermediary between the Mongols of Central Asia and the lands of the subcontinent. One testament to Qarlughid prosperity is the significant coinage found from this dynasty.

See also 
 Hazara-i-Karlugh

References

External links 
 http://collection.britishmuseum.org/id/thesauri/x116561
 http://grifterrec.rasmir.com/islam/qarlughid.html

Turkic peoples of Asia
Dynasties of Afghanistan
History of Pakistan
Empires and kingdoms of India
History of Ghazni Province
Muslim dynasties